Ernest Wenkert, (16 October 1925 – 20 June 2014) was an Austrian-born American chemist.

Wenkert received B.S. (1945) and M.S. (1947) degrees in chemistry from the University of Washington. In 1951, he was awarded a Ph.D. degree in organic chemistry from Harvard University, where he studied under Robert Burns Woodward. From 1951, he served as a faculty member at Iowa State University, and was in 1961 appointed as the Herman T. Briscoe Professor of Chemistry at Indiana University. In 1974, he took the position as E.D. Butcher Professor of Chemistry at Rice University, also serving as chair of the chemistry department. In 1980, he moved to the University of California, San Diego, where he stayed until his retirement in 1994.

Sources 
 Ainsworth, S.J., Chem. Eng. News, 2015, 93 (19); https://cen.acs.org/articles/93/i19/Ernest-Wenkert.html
 Mike De Martino, Baran Group Meeting 01/26/2004; https://www.scripps.edu/baran/images/grpmtgpdf/Demartino_Jan_05.pdf

References 

1925 births
2014 deaths
University of Washington alumni
Harvard Graduate School of Arts and Sciences alumni
Iowa State University faculty
Indiana University Bloomington faculty
Rice University faculty
University of California, San Diego faculty
20th-century American chemists
21st-century American chemists
Austrian emigrants to the United States